Geraldine Mack Joseph (born June 19, 1923) is an American journalist, academic and political figure who served as United States Ambassador to the Netherlands.

Life and career
Geraldine Mack was born in Saint Paul, Minnesota on June 19, 1923.  She graduated with a degree in journalism from the University of Minnesota in 1946 and became a staff writer for the Minneapolis Star-Tribune, where she worked until 1953.  In 1948 she worked as a speechwriter for Hubert H. Humphrey during his successful campaign for United States Senator. In 1956 she was active in the campaign of Adlai Stevenson.

From 1962 to 1963 she became a member of the National Commission on Youth Employment, and from 1962 to 1967 she served on the National Institute of Mental Health Advisory Council.  She served on the National Commission on Income Maintenance Programs from 1967 to 1969.  Joseph served as President of the National Mental Health Association from 1968 to 1969.

Active in Democratic Party politics, Joseph served as Chairwoman of the Minnesota Democratic–Farmer–Labor Party.  In 1959 she was named a member of the Democratic National Committee from Minnesota and in 1968 she became Vice Chairwoman of the DNC.

From 1972 to 1978, she was a contributing editor and columnist for the Star-Tribune. In 1977 she was appointed to the U.S. Commission on Mental Health.

She was appointed U.S. Ambassador to the Netherlands in 1978, and served until 1981. From 1983 to 1993 Ambassador Joseph was a Senior Fellow at the University of Minnesota's Hubert H. Humphrey School of Public Affairs.

Joseph served as a member of the Council on Foreign Relations and a member of the Carleton College Council.  She has also been a member of the board of directors for companies including Honeywell, Hormel, Northwestern Bell and Northwestern National Bank.

Awards
Ambassador Joseph's awards include honorary doctorates from Bates College, Macalester College and Carleton College.  She has also been recognized by the University of Minnesota's School of Journalism, the Anti-Defamation League, and the Humphrey Institute.  Her husband and she are Jewish and have been active in their congregation.

Famly
Her husband, Burton M. Joseph, was a commodities broker with whom she had three children, sons Scott and Jon, and a daughter.  In 2003 her daughter, Shelley Joseph Kordell, was shot and killed at the Hennepin County Government Center by her cousin Susan Berkovitz, with whom she was involved in a property dispute.  Her attorney, Richard Hendrickson, was also wounded in the attack. Berkovitz was convicted and is serving a life sentence.

References

External resources
 Office of the Historian, U.S. department of State, Record of Appointment, Geri M. Joseph, accessed December 31, 2012

1923 births
Living people
Jewish American journalists
Writers from Minneapolis
University of Minnesota School of Journalism and Mass Communication alumni
American women journalists
Minnesota Democrats
Ambassadors of the United States to the Netherlands
American women ambassadors
21st-century American Jews
21st-century American women